Orgao is a village in Ponda taluka, North Goa district in the Indian state of Goa.

For the purposes of the census, it is considered a "Census Town". It is however part of the Orgao-Tivrem Village Panchayat.

As of the 2011 census, Orgao was found to have an area of 3.50 square kilometres, with a total of 1,156 households, and a population of 4,602 persons, comprising 2,264 males and 2,338 females. The zero-to-six age group population comprised 383 children, of these 207 were males and 176 females.

References

Villages in North Goa district